Mount Austin Road is a street in Victoria Peak, Hong Kong.

References

External links

 

Roads on Hong Kong Island
Victoria Peak